Virgin Media Four, also called Virgin Four  is an Irish television channel from Virgin Media Television.

The channel focuses on general entertainment programming from both Ireland and the UK as well as weekly coverage of the NFL.

The channel launched on 24 August 2022.

History
Virgin Media Ireland confirmed it would launch a new channel in August 2022, at a Virgin Media Showcase event. The channel is currently available on Saorview and Virgin Media. It's unknown if the channel will launch on Sky or be made available to watch on the Virgin Media Player.

The channels programming is largely a replay of previously aired content from across Virgin Media channels with little investment in Irish content. The channels schedule is dependent on content from UK broadcaster ITV and generally broadcasts double episodes of programmes to fill its schedule.

Programming
Winning Combination
The Chase 
The Hotel Inspector
Ireland’s Paramedics 
Don’t Look Back In Anger
The Group Chat
Two Sides

References

External links
 

Television stations in Ireland
Television channels and stations established in 2022
Virgin Media More